Sweet Briar is a historic farm house located near Geneseo in Livingston County, New York.

History
The main house was built about 1898 by George and Isabel Valle Austen on land that had been previously owned by Horatio Jones and the Wadsworth family. It was then the home of Winthrop and Margaret Ward Terry Chanler. It is a -story frame building with clapboard siding and a hipped roof with dormers.  It is in a "U" shape and features a grand Tuscan colonnade.  Also on the property are contributing gate posts, a stable, fountain, two tenant houses, and the Chapel of St. Felicitas. The chapel was built in 1913 and is a small stucco building with a slate roof and stained glass windows. The structure was later moved to the neighboring home near Fall Brook. The main house (with ten acres) was sold in 2004 and operated as a bed and breakfast, wedding venue, spa and yoga studio until 2014. Currently Sweet Briar is a private residence.

It was listed on the National Register of Historic Places in 2010.

See also
List of Registered Historic Places in Livingston County, New York

References

External links
 Sweetbriar at the Association for the Preservation of Geneseo

Houses on the National Register of Historic Places in New York (state)
Houses completed in 1898
Houses in Livingston County, New York
National Register of Historic Places in Livingston County, New York
Chanler family